The 1901 Nobel Prize in Literature was the first awarded Nobel Prize in Literature. It was awarded to the French poet Sully Prudhomme (1839–1907) "in special recognition of his poetic composition, which gives evidence of lofty idealism, artistic perfection and a rare combination of the qualities of both heart and intellect."

Laureate

Sully Prudhomme belonged to a school of poets that wanted to write in a classic and formally elegant style. His poetry combined formal perfection with an interest in science and philosophy. According to the Swedish Academy, his elevated poetry fit in Alfred Nobel's formulation about works "in an ideal direction".

Deliberations

Nominations

Sully Prudhomme was nominated for the prize by 17 members of the Académie Française, of which Sully Prudhomme himself was a member. In total the Nobel committee received 37 nominations for 26 individuals including Frédéric Mistral (five nominations) and Henryk Sienkiewicz (three nominations) who were subsequently both awarded the prize, and the only woman nominated, Malwida von Meysenburg. The first name on their list of candidates was Émile Zola, but the campaign from the Académie Française proved to be successful and the Swedish Academy chose to award Sully Prudhomme.

The notable authors R. D. Blackmore, Anne Beale, Victoire Léodile Béra, Stephen Crane, Ernest Dowson, José Maria de Eça de Queiroz, Carit Etlar, Naim Frashëri, Mary Kingsley, Max Müller, Friedrich Nietzsche, Sigbjørn Obstfelder, Pyotr Lavrov, John Ruskin, Henry Sidgwick, Charles Dudley Warner, Oscar Wilde, Vladimir Solovyov and Gheorghe Dem Teodorescu all died in 1900, making them ineligible for the 1901 nominations. The nominated French theologian Louis Sabatier died months before the announcement, and authors Leopoldo Alas, Víctor Balaguer i Cirera, Walter Besant, Ada Christen, Ramón de Campoamor, Luis Mariano de Larra, Kate Greenaway, Julien Leclercq, William Cosmo Monkhouse, Frederic W. H. Myers, Johanna Spyri, Grigore Sturdza, Maurice Thompson, Vasile Alexandrescu Urechia, Brooke Foss Westcott and Charlotte Mary Yonge died in 1901 without having been nominated for the prize.

Reactions
The Swedish Academy's decision to award Sully Prudhomme the first Nobel Prize in Literature was heavily criticised at the time and remains one of the most criticised prize decisions in the history of the Nobel Prize in literature. The choice of Sully Prudhomme was interpreted as a politeness towards the Académie Française, model to the Swedish Academy. Many believed that Lev Tolstoy should have been awarded the first Nobel Prize in literature. The leading representatives of the contemporary Swedish cultural elite including August Strindberg, Selma Lagerlöf, Verner von Heidenstam, Oscar Levertin, Bruno Liljefors, Anders Zorn and Albert Engström protested against the Academy saying they believed that Tolstoy was the most worthy recipient of the prize. An English newspaper said that Sully Prudhomme was a second rate poet who had not achieved anything in many years. Also from France and Germany came critical reactions with opinions that Tolstoy was the superior candidate for the prize.

Notes

References

External links
Award ceremony speech by C.D. af Wirsén nobelprize.org

1901